Montcornet may refer to:

 Montcornet, Aisne, a municipality in the Aisne department, France
 Battle of Montcornet, an engagement of the Battle of France on 17 May 1940
 Montcornet, Ardennes, in the Ardennes department, France
 Château de Montcornet, a castle